Soldiers of the Storm is a 1933 American Pre-Code crime film directed by D. Ross Lederman and starring Regis Toomey, Anita Page and Robert Ellis.

Synopsis
When a new airport opens in a town close to the Mexican border, the Border Patrol recruits pilot Brad Allerton to go undercover to investigate potential drug smuggling.

Cast
 Regis Toomey as Brad Allerton
 Anita Page as Natalie
 Robert Ellis as Moran
 Wheeler Oakman as George
 Barbara Barondess as Sonia
 Dewey Robinson as Chuck Bailey
 George Cooper as Red Gurney
 Arthur Wanzer as	Adams
 Barbara Weeks as Spanish waitress
 Henry Wadsworth as 	Dodie

References

External links
 

1933 films
1933 crime films
American black-and-white films
American crime films
Columbia Pictures films
1930s English-language films
Films directed by D. Ross Lederman
American aviation films
1930s American films